The 2020 Colorado Rapids season is the club's twenty-fifth season of existence and their twenty-fifth consecutive season in Major League Soccer (MLS), the top flight of American soccer. The club qualified for the MLS Cup Playoffs for the first time since the 2016 season. Colorado were also set compete in the U.S. Open Cup before its cancellation. The season covers the period from October 7, 2019, to the conclusion of the MLS Cup Playoffs.

Background 

Colorado finished the 2019 season 9th in the Western Conference table, and 16th overall in MLS. Kei Kamara lead Colorado with 14 goals across all competitions. The club fired head coach Anthony Hudson on May 1, 2019, following a nine-match winless streak to start the season. Conor Casey served as interim head coach until the hiring of Robin Fraser as the club's new head coach on August 25. Outside of MLS play, the Rapids played in the 2019 edition of the U.S. Open Cup, where they lost in the fourth round to New Mexico United.

Overview 

The Rapids started the season with wins over D.C. United and Orlando City SC before Major League Soccer paused the 2020 season due to COVID-19. The league returned to action in July with the MLS is Back Tournament in Orlando, Fla., with Colorado in Group D with Minnesota United FC, Real Salt Lake and Sporting Kansas City. After another month-long pause, MLS returned to in-market play in August. Colorado took three points from four games before reclaiming the Rocky Mountain Cup with a 5-0 win over RSL on Sept. 12. The win was Colorado's first ever at Rio Tinto Stadium and started a run of three wins in four, including three clean sheets. After a series of positive COVID test results, MLS postponed Rapids matches for one month. In all, five Rapids matches were cancelled, which, in addition to other cancellations around the league, prompted MLS to alter MLS Cup Playoff qualification to a points per game basis. The Rapids won their final three matches to qualify for the Audi 2020 MLS Cup Playoffs for the first time since 2016, capturing the fifth seed in the Western Conference. Colorado visited fourth-seed Minnesota and lost, 3-0.

The season saw head coach Robin Fraser post the best record of any Rapids head coach through his first 25 games in charge. In their first 25 games under Fraser, the Rapids scored 47 goals, won 13 games and earned 43 points, all the most by a Rapids head coach since the introduction of draws to MLS in 2000.

After scoring the third-most goals in MLS with 58 in 2019, Colorado scored 32 goals in 18 games. Colorado's 1.78 goals per game ranked sixth in MLS in 2020. The Rapids also posted their first positive goal differential (+4) since 2016 and the seventh time in club history.

Several Rapids enjoyed breakout years in 2020, including Homegrown midfielder Cole Bassett and Homegrown defender Sam Vines. Bassett, from Littleton, Colo., turned 19 in July and finished the season as Colorado's leader with five goals and five assists. Vines, 21 years old from Colorado Springs, was the only player on the roster to play every minute in the regular season, adding the first goal and three assists of his MLS career. The duo was named to MLS 22 Under 22 for a second consecutive year. In February, Vines became the first Rapids Academy product to start a match for the USMNT, while Bassett scored four goals in four appearances with the U.S. U-20s and earned his first senior USMNT call-up for the December 2020 camp, joining Rapids teammates Vines and midfielder Kellyn Acosta. It was Acosta's first call-up in two years.

Roster

Out on loan

Competitions

Preseason

Friendlies

Major League Soccer

Standings

Western Conference

Overall table

Results summary

Results by round

Match results

MLS Cup Playoffs

The Rapids clinched a spot in the playoffs on November 4.

MLS is Back Tournament

Group stage

U.S. Open Cup

Note: The 2020 U.S Open Cup was suspended on March 13, due to the COVID-19 pandemic. The tournament was canceled on August 14.

Statistics

Appearances and goals

Numbers after plus–sign (+) denote appearances as a substitute.

|-
! colspan=14 style=background:#dcdcdc; text-align:center| Players transferred/loaned out during the season

Top scorers
{| class="wikitable" style="font-size: 95%; text-align: center;"
|-
!width=30|Rank
!width=30|Position
!width=30|Number
!width=175|Name
!width=75|
!width=75|
!width=75|Total
|-
|rowspan="2"|1
| FW || 7 ||align="left"| Jonathan Lewis
| 5 || 0 || 5
|-
| MF || 26 ||align="left"| Cole Bassett
| 5 || 0 || 5
|-
|rowspan="1"|3
| FW || 99 ||align="left"| Andre Shinyashiki
| 4 || 0 || 4
|-
|rowspan="2"|4
| FW || 11 ||align="left"| Diego Rubio
| 3 || 0 || 3
|-
| FW || 23 ||align="left"| Kei Kamara
| 3 || 0 || 3
|-
|rowspan="2"|6
| MF || 10 ||align="left| Kellyn Acosta
| 2 || 0 || 2
|-
| MF || 21 ||align="left"| Younes Namli
| 2 || 0 || 2
|-
|rowspan="6"|8
| DF || 2 ||align="left"| Keegan Rosenberry
| 1 || 0 || 1
|-
| DF || 3 ||align="left"| Drew Moor
| 1 || 0 || 1
|-
| DF || 6 ||align="left"| Lalas Abubakar
| 1 || 0 || 1
|-
| DF || 13 ||align="left"| Sam Vines
| 1 || 0 || 1
|-
| MF || 20 ||align="left"| Nicolás Mezquida
| 1 || 0 || 1
|-
| FW || 52 ||align="left"| Braian Galván
| 1 || 0 || 1
|-
!colspan="4"|Total !! 30 !! 0 !! 30
|-

Top assists
{| class="wikitable" style="font-size: 95%; text-align: center;"
|-
!width=30|Rank
!width=30|Position
!width=30|Number
!width=175|Name
!width=75|
!width=75|
!width=75|Total
|-
|rowspan="1"|1
| MF || 26 ||align="left"|  Cole Bassett
| 5 || 0 || 5
|-
|rowspan="2"|2
| FW || 11 ||align="left"|  Diego Rubio
| 4 || 0 || 4
|-
| MF || 19 ||align="left"|  Jack Price
| 4 || 0 || 4
|-
|rowspan="2"|4
| DF || 13 ||align="left"|  Sam Vines
| 3 || 0 || 3
|-
| MF || 21 ||align="left"|  Younes Namli
| 3 || 0 || 3
|-
|rowspan="2"|6
| DF || 2 ||align="left"|  Keegan Rosenberry
| 2 || 0 || 2
|-
| FW || 9 ||align="left"|  Nicolas Benezet
| 2 || 0 || 2
|-
|rowspan="6"|8
| DF || 5 ||align="left"|  Auston Trusty
| 1 || 0 || 1
|-
| MF || 10 ||align="left"|  Kellyn Acosta
| 1 || 0 || 1
|-
| MF || 18 ||align="left"|  Jeremy Kelly
| 1 || 0 || 1
|-
| MF || 20 ||align="left"| Nicolás Mezquida
| 1 || 0 || 1
|-
| FW || 23 ||align="left"|  Kei Kamara
| 1 || 0 || 1
|-
| FW || 52 ||align="left"|  Braian Galván
| 1 || 0 || 1
|-
!colspan="4"|Total !! 29 !! 0 !! 29
|-

Clean sheets
{| class="wikitable" style="font-size: 95%; text-align: center;"
|-
!width=30|Rank
!width=30|Position
!width=30|Number
!width=175|Name
!width=75|
!width=75|
!width=75|Total
|-
|rowspan="1"|1
| GK || 50 || align=left| William Yarbrough
| 4 || 0 || 4
|-
!colspan="4"|Total !! 4 !! 0 !! 4

Disciplinary record
{| class="wikitable" style="text-align:center;"
|-
| rowspan="2" !width=15|Rank
| rowspan="2" !width=15|
| rowspan="2" !width=15|
| rowspan="2" !width=120|Player
| colspan="3"|MLS
| colspan="3"|MLS Cup Playoffs
| colspan="3"|Total
|-
!width=34; background:#fe9;|
!width=34; background:#fe9;|
!width=34; background:#ff8888;|
!width=34; background:#fe9;|
!width=34; background:#fe9;|
!width=34; background:#ff8888;|
!width=34; background:#fe9;|
!width=34; background:#fe9;|
!width=34; background:#ff8888;|
|-
|rowspan="1"|1
| 6 || DF ||align=left| Lalas Abubakar
|| 5 || 0 || 0 || 1 || 0 || 0 || 6 || 0 || 0
|-
|rowspan="2"|2
| 19 || MF ||align=left| Jack Price
|| 4 || 0 || 1 || 0 || 0 || 0 || 4 || 0 || 1
|-
| 10 || MF ||align=left| Kellyn Acosta
|| 5 || 0 || 0 || 0 || 0 || 0 || 5 || 0 || 0
|-
|rowspan="1"|4
| 11 || FW ||align=left| Diego Rubio
|| 3 || 0 || 0 || 0 || 0 || 0 || 3 || 0 || 0
|-
|rowspan="4"|5
| 4 || DF ||align=left| Danny Wilson
|| 1 || 0 || 1 || 0 || 0 || 0 || 1 || 0 || 1
|-
| 3 || DF ||align=left| Drew Moor
|| 2 || 0 || 0 || 0 || 0 || 0 || 2 || 0 || 0
|-
| 21 || MF ||align=left| Younes Namli
|| 1 || 0 || 0 || 1 || 0 || 0 || 2 || 0 || 0
|-
| 99 || FW ||align=left| Andre Shinyashiki
|| 2 || 0 || 0 || 0 || 0 || 0 || 2 || 0 || 0
|-
|rowspan="7"|9
| 1 || GK ||align=left| Clint Irwin
|| 1 || 0 || 0 || 0 || 0 || 0 || 1 || 0 || 0
|-
| 7 || FW ||align=left| Jonathan Lewis
|| 1 || 0 || 0 || 0 || 0 || 0 || 1 || 0 || 0
|-
| 9 || FW ||align=left| Nicolas Benezet
|| 1 || 0 || 0 || 0 || 0 || 0 || 1 || 0 || 0
|-
| 20 || MF ||align=left| Nicolás Mezquida
|| 1 || 0 || 0 || 0 || 0 || 0 || 1 || 0 || 0
|-
| 23 || FW ||align=left| Kei Kamara
|| 1 || 0 || 0 || 0 || 0 || 0 || 1 || 0 || 0
|-
| 26 || MF ||align=left| Cole Bassett
|| 1 || 0 || 0 || 0 || 0 || 0 || 1 || 0 || 0 
|-
| 32 || MF ||align=left| Collen Warner
|| 1 || 0 || 0 || 0 || 0 || 0 || 1 || 0 || 0
|-
!colspan="4"|Total !! 30 !! 0 !! 2 !! 2 !! 0 !! 0 !! 32 !! 0 !! 2

Transfers

For transfers in, dates listed are when the Rapids officially signed the players to the roster. For transfers out, dates are listed when the Rapids officially removed the players from the roster, not when they signed with another club. If a player later signed with a different club, his new club will be noted, but the date listed remains when he was officially removed from the roster.

In

Loans in

SuperDraft

Draft picks are not automatically signed to the team roster. Only those who are signed to a contract will be listed as transfers in. Only trades involving draft picks and executed after the start of the 2020 MLS SuperDraft will be listed in the notes.

Out

Loans out

See also
 Colorado Rapids
 2020 in American soccer
 2020 Major League Soccer season

References

Colorado Rapids seasons
Colorado Rapids
Colorado Rapids
Colorado Rapids